Conrad Vernon Field is a baseball venue located in Longview, TX and home to the LeTourneau Yellow Jackets baseball program of the American Southwest Conference. The ballpark holds a capacity of 200.

References

Baseball venues in East Texas
Baseball venues in Texas
LeTourneau University
College baseball venues in the United States